The following is a list of notable deaths in March 2019.

Entries for each day are listed alphabetically by surname. A typical entry lists information in the following sequence:
 Name, age, country of citizenship at birth, subsequent country of citizenship (if applicable), reason for notability, cause of death (if known), and reference.

March 2019

1
Zhores Alferov, 88, Russian physicist and politician, MP (since 1995), Nobel Prize laureate (2000).
Kumar Bhattacharyya, Baron Bhattacharyya, 78, British-Indian engineer, educator and government advisor, member of the House of Lords (since 2004).
Jawaid Bhutto, 64, Pakistani philosopher, shot.
Dhritikanta Lahiri Choudhury, 87, Indian naturalist.
Joseph Flummerfelt, 82, American conductor, stroke.
Håkon Wexelsen Freihow, 91, Norwegian diplomat, Ambassador to Japan (1981–1989) and Portugal (1992–1995).
Phaedon Georgitsis, 80, Greek actor (The Red Lanterns, Blood on the Land, Marijuana Stop!), brain cancer.
Maïmouna Kane, 82, Senegalese jurist and politician, Minister of Social Development (1983–1986).
Sibusiso Khwinana, 25, South African actor, stabbed.
Ivars Knēts, 80, Latvian engineer and educator.
Ludo Loos, 64, Belgian racing cyclist.
Elly Mayday, 30, Canadian model and women's health advocate, ovarian cancer.
Eusebio Pedroza, 65, Panamanian Hall of Fame boxer, WBA featherweight champion (1978–1985), pancreatic cancer.
Kevin Roche, 96, Irish-born American architect, Pritzker Prize winner (1982).
Polan Sarkar, 97, Bangladeshi literacy activist.
Mahadi Sinambela, 71, Indonesian politician, Minister of Youth and Sport (1999–2000).
Robert S. Summers, 85, American legal scholar.
Mike Tamoaieta, 23, Samoan-born New Zealand rugby union player (Blues, North Harbour).
Peter van Gestel, 81, Dutch author.
Mike Willesee, 76, Australian television journalist (This Day Tonight, Four Corners, A Current Affair), throat cancer.
Paul Williams, 78, English singer (Zoot Money's Big Roll Band, Juicy Lucy, Allan Holdsworth).
Hennric David Yeboah, 62, Ghanaian politician, MP (2004–2015).

2
Bharat Mohan Adhikari, 82, Nepalese politician, Minister of Finance (1994–1995), pneumonia.
Derek Aikman, 59, Belizean politician, MP (1984–1992).
Reinhold Aman, 82, German-born American chemical engineer and linguist.
Arnulf Baring, 86, German political scientist, historian and author.
Yannis Behrakis, 58, Greek photojournalist, cancer.
Keith Davis, 88, New Zealand rugby union player (Auckland, New Zealand Māori, national team).
John E. Gallagher, 61, American television director (ER, Criminal Minds, The Good Wife), cardiac arrest.
Liam Gilmartin, 97, Irish Gaelic footballer (St. Dominics).
Jack Gregory, 74, American football player (Cleveland Browns, New York Giants).
Tullio Gregory, 90, Italian philosopher.
Al Hazan, 84, American pianist (B. Bumble and the Stingers), songwriter and record producer.
David Held, 68, British political scientist.
Fred Hill, 84, American baseball coach (Rutgers University).
Med Hondo, 82, Mauritanian-French film director (Soleil O, Sarraounia), screenwriter and actor (1871).
Ed Keats, 104, American rear admiral, complications from a fall.
János Koós, 81, Hungarian singer, parodist and actor.
Franco Macri, 88, Italian-born Argentine businessman.
Keith Harvey Miller, 94, American politician, Alaska Secretary of State (1966–1969) and Governor (1969–1970), pancreatic cancer.
Colleen Mulvihill, 66, American Olympic gymnast (1968).
Andra Neiburga, 62, Latvian writer.
Mike Oliver, 74, British disability rights activist.
Ogden Reid, 93, American publisher, diplomat, and politician, Ambassador to Israel (1959–1961) and member of the U.S. House of Representatives (1963–1975).
Werner Schneyder, 82, Austrian writer, director and actor.
Beatriz Taibo, 88, Argentine actress.
Rafael Torija de la Fuente, 91, Spanish Roman Catholic prelate, Auxiliary Bishop of Santander (1969–1976) and Bishop of Ciudad Real (1976–2003).
Otto Trefný, 87, Czech politician, MP, physician of the national ice hockey team, member of the Czech Ice Hockey Hall of Fame.

3
Tom Bass, 92, American politician.
John Bloom, 87, English entrepreneur (Rolls Razor).
Harry Joseph Bowman, 69, American criminal, president of Outlaws Motorcycle Club.
Leo de Castro, 70, New Zealand singer and guitarist.
Bobbi Fiedler, 81, American politician, member of the U.S. House of Representatives (1981–1987).
Kyle Forti, 29, American political consultant, helicopter crash.
David Gadsby, 71, British physiologist.
Martí Galindo, 81, Spanish stage actor.
José García Ladrón de Guevara, 89, Spanish poet and journalist, Senator (1979–2000).
Elva Martha García Rocha, 72, Mexican politician, founder of the Party of the Democratic Revolution and member of the Legislative Assembly of Mexico City (1997–2000).
Ben Hamilton-Baillie, 63, British architect, cancer.
John Howlett, 78, English screenwriter and author.
Peter Hurford, 88, British organist and composer, complications from Alzheimer's disease.
Mark Klempner, 63, American folklorist.
Lee Wen, 61, Singaporean performance artist, lung infection.
Richard Lewis, 79, Australian politician.
Roger W. Titus, 77, American senior judge, U.S. District Judge for Maryland (since 2003), liposarcoma.
Uroš Tošković, 86, Montenegrin painter.

4
King Kong Bundy, 63, American professional wrestler (WCCW, WWF) and actor (Married...with Children), complications from diabetes.
Eric Caldow, 84, Scottish footballer (Rangers, national team).
Les Carlyon, 76, Australian writer and newspaper editor (The Age, The Herald).
Edward Collins, 78, Irish politician, TD (1969–1987).
Juan Corona, 85, Mexican serial killer.
Wilbur Cross, 100, American author.
Garfield Davies, Baron Davies of Coity, 83, British trade unionist (USDAW) and life peer.
Robert DeProspero, 80, American Secret Service agent, amyloidosis.
Robert Wagner Dowling, 94, Canadian politician.
Keith Flint, 49, English singer (The Prodigy), suicide by hanging.
Art Hughes, 88, Canadian soccer player (Vancouver Firefighters).
Klaus Kinkel, 82, German politician, Minister of Justice (1991–1992) and Foreign Affairs (1992–1998), Vice Chancellor (1993–1998).
V. Dhananjay Kumar, 67, Indian politician, MP (1991–2004), Minister of Civil Aviation and Tourism (1996), kidney disease.
Ted Lindsay, 93, Canadian Hall of Fame ice hockey player (Detroit Red Wings, Chicago Blackhawks).
Mao Zhiyong, 89, Chinese politician, Party Secretary of Hunan and Jiangxi provinces, Vice Chairman of the CPPCC.
Luke Perry, 52, American actor (Beverly Hills, 90210, Riverdale, Buffy the Vampire Slayer), complications from a stroke.
Albert Redhead, 77, Grenadian lawyer and jurist (Eastern Caribbean Supreme Court).
Anthony Ríos, 68, Dominican actor and singer-songwriter, heart attack.
Jean Starobinski, 98, Swiss literary critic.
Michael Thomas, 66, British actor (Life Without George, The Boat That Rocked, Head over Heels), myeloma.
Maya Turovskaya, 94, Russian theatrical and film critic, film historian and screenwriter.
Sidney Verba, 86, American political scientist and librarian.
Rick Walters, 73, American tattoo artist.

5
Richard Allen, 90, Canadian politician.
Geoffrey Beck, 100, English cricketer (Oxfordshire) and Congregational minister.
Chu Shijian, 91, Chinese tobacco executive (Hongtashan) and convicted embezzler, complications from diabetes.
André Damien, 88, French lawyer and politician, Supreme Court Justice (1981–1997), mayor of Versailles (1977–1995), Deputy (1996–1997).
Ding Yi, 91, Chinese engineer and business executive, founded Dongfang Electric.
Moris Farhi, 84, Turkish author, Vice-President of PEN International (since 2001), heart disease.
Khagen Gogoi, 92, Indian politician, MLA (1972–1978).
Susan Harrison, 80, American actress (Sweet Smell of Success).
Stephen Irwin, 79, Canadian architect.
Aleksandra Kasuba, 95–96, Lithuanian-born American environmental artist.
David Kear, 95, British-born New Zealand geologist and science administrator, director-general of the Department of Scientific and Industrial Research (1980–1983).
Bernard Krisher, 87, German-born American journalist (Newsweek, Fortune) and philanthropist.
Miroljub Lešo, 72, Serbian actor.
Jacques Loussier, 84, French pianist and composer.
Boro Maa, 100, Indian religious leader, matriarch of the Matua Mahasangha.
Andrzej Mateja, 83, Polish Olympic skier (1956, 1960).
Luis Matte Valdés, 85, Chilean politician, mayor of La Florida (1961–1964) and Minister of Housing and Urbanism (1972–1973).
Doru Popovici, 87, Romanian composer, musicologist and writer.
Esteban Righi, 80, Argentine lawyer and politician, Minister of the Interior (1973) and Attorney General (2004–2012).
Abraham Stavans, 86, Mexican actor (El Chavo del Ocho, Once Upon a Scoundrel, Original Sin) and theatre director.
Yang Naisi, 91, Chinese linguist.

6
Andrey Anufriyenko, 48, Russian Olympic speed skater (1994, 1998).
Grayston Burgess, 86, English opera singer and conductor.
Sir Simon Cassels, 91, British admiral, Second Sea Lord (1982–1986).
Ernesto Horacio Crespo, 89, Argentine military officer, Chief of the General Staff of the Argentine Air Force (1985–1989).
James Dapogny, 78, American jazz musicologist and pianist.
Magenta Devine, 61, British television presenter (Rough Guide, Network 7).
Alí Domínguez, 26, Venezuelan journalist and politician, beaten.
Guillaume Faye, 69, French journalist and writer, cancer.
Typist Gopu, 85, Indian actor.
John Habgood, Baron Habgood, 91, British Anglican bishop, academic, and life peer, Bishop of Durham (1973–1983), Archbishop of York (1983–1995).
Frances Heussenstamm, 90, American artist.
Rachel Ingalls, 78, American author, multiple myeloma.
Mai Chao-cheng, 77, Taiwanese economist, member of Academia Sinica.
Gordon Osbaldeston, 88, Canadian civil servant.
Charlie Panigoniak, 72, Canadian Inuktitut singer and guitarist.
José Pedro Pérez-Llorca, 78, Spanish lawyer, diplomat and politician, Deputy (1977–1982) and Minister of Foreign Affairs (1980–1982), co-Father of the 1978 Constitution.
Daniel Rudisha, 73, Kenyan sprinter, Olympic silver medalist (1968), heart attack.
Carolee Schneemann, 79, American visual artist.
Brian Sully, 82–83, Australian judge.

7
Dick Beyer, 88, American Hall of Fame professional wrestler (AJPW, WWA, AWA).
Joseph H. Boardman, 70, American railroad executive, president and CEO of Amtrak (2008–2016), complications from a stroke.
Robert Braithwaite, 75, British marine engineer and executive, founder of Sunseeker.
Johnny Brittain, 86–87, British motorcycle racer.
Pino Caruso, 84, Italian actor (La governante, The Sunday Woman, Il ficcanaso).
Kelly Catlin, 23, American cyclist, Olympic silver medalist (2016) and world champion (2016, 2017, 2018), suicide by asphyxiation.
William J. Creber, 87, American art director and production designer (The Poseidon Adventure, The Towering Inferno, Planet of the Apes), complications from pneumonia.
Raymond Donnez, 76, French music producer and conductor.
Daniel de Fernando, 81, Spanish pharmacist and politician, Deputy (1977–1979), President of Ávila province (1979–1982, 1987–1991).
Ralph Hall, 95, American politician, member of the U.S. House of Representatives (1981–2015) and the Texas Senate (1963–1973).
Dan Jenkins, 90, American author and sportswriter (Sports Illustrated, Golf Digest, Playboy).
Kusalakumari, 83, Indian actress (Konjum Salangai, Koondukkili).
Patrick Lane, 79, Canadian poet, heart attack.
Hi Duk Lee, 79, Korean-born American grocer, restaurateur and hotelier, cancer.
Sam Miller, 97, American realty executive (Forest City).
Dick Nichols, 92, American politician, member of the U.S. House of Representatives (1991–1993).
Carmine Persico, 85, American mobster and convicted racketeer, head of Colombo crime family (1973–1990, since 1993), complications from diabetes.
Rosto, 50, Dutch artist and filmmaker, lung cancer.
Ron Russell, 92, New Zealand-born Canadian politician, member (1978–2006) and Speaker (1998–1999) of the Nova Scotia House of Assembly.
Sidney Sheinberg, 84, American lawyer and studio executive, President of MCA Inc. (1973–1995).
Shen Ziyin, 91, Chinese physician and medical researcher, academician of the Chinese Academy of Sciences.
Issei Suda, 78, Japanese photographer.
Anne Sjerp Troelstra, 79, Dutch mathematician.

8
Raoul Barrière, 91, French rugby union player (AS Béziers, national team) and coach (RC Narbonne).
Marshall Brodien, 84, American magician and actor (The Bozo Show), complications from Alzheimer's disease.
Mike Colbern, 63, American baseball player (Chicago White Sox).
Nothando Dube, 31, Swazi royal, skin cancer.
Michael Gielen, 91, Austrian conductor.
D. Shelton A. Gunaratne, 79, Sri Lankan-born American academic.
Cedrick Hardman, 70, American football player (San Francisco 49ers, Oakland Raiders).
Roland Hedlund, 85, Swedish actor (Ådalen 31, The Hunters), stroke.
Frank Joranko, 88, American football and baseball player and coach (Albion).
Ian Lawrence, 82, Australian-born New Zealand politician, Mayor of Wellington (1983−1986), bowel cancer.
David Martin, 89, British sociologist and Anglican priest.
Mel Miller, 79, American lawyer and politician, member (1971−1991) and Speaker (1987−1991) of the New York State Assembly, lung cancer.
George Morfogen, 85, American actor (Oz, V).
Mesrob II Mutafyan of Constantinople, 62, Turkish religious leader, Armenian Patriarch of Constantinople (1998–2016), dementia.
Jaume Muxart, 96, Spanish painter.
Nate Ramsey, 77, American football player (Philadelphia Eagles, New Orleans Saints).
Jason Reese, 51, British engineer.
Frankie Smith, 65–66, American funk and R&B musician.
Eddie Taylor Jr., 46, American blues singer and guitarist, heart failure.
Cynthia Thompson, 96, Jamaican Olympic sprinter (1948) and CAC champion (1946).
Mike Watterson, 76, English snooker player, promoter and commentator.

9
Sveinung Aarnseth, 85, Norwegian footballer (Lyn, national team).
Jed Allan, 84, American actor (Days of Our Lives, Santa Barbara, Lassie).
Joe Auer, 77, American football player (Buffalo Bills, Miami Dolphins, Atlanta Falcons).
Akhteruzzaman Babul, 63, Bangladeshi politician, MP (1988–1990).
Anna Costanza Baldry, 48, Italian social psychologist and criminologist.
Tom Ballard, 30, British rock climber, rock climbing accident. (body discovered on this date)
George Benson, 90, American jazz saxophonist.
Alberto Bucci, 70, Italian basketball coach (Fortitudo Bologna, Virtus Bologna, Scaligera Verona), cancer.
Chokoleit, 46, Filipino actor (Love Spell, Marina, Asintado) and comedian, heart attack.
Bernard Binlin Dadié, 103, Ivorian novelist, playwright and poet, Minister of Culture (1977–1986).
Vladimir Etush, 96, Russian actor (Kidnapping, Caucasian Style, The Twelve Chairs, 31 June), People's Artist of the USSR (1984), heart failure.
Patrick Grandperret, 72, French film director and screenwriter (Murderers).
Heo Yong-mo, 53, South Korean boxer, stomach cancer.
Harry Howell, 86, Canadian Hall of Fame ice hockey player (New York Rangers, Los Angeles Kings).
Jadwiga Janus, 87, Polish sculptor.
Wenche Kvamme, 68, Norwegian actress, cancer.
Robert Lemaître, 90, French footballer.
Albert Marenčin, 96, Slovak writer, translator and screenwriter.
Leonidas Ralph Mecham, 90, American lawyer, director of the Administrative Office of the United States Courts (1985–2006).
Abdul Ali Mridha, Bangladeshi politician.
Pierre de Saintignon, 70, French politician.
Olatoye Temitope Sugar, 47, Nigerian politician, MP (since 2015), shot.
Francesca Sundsten, 59, American bassist (The Beakers) and artist, lymphoma.
Johnny Thompson, 84, American magician.
Kevin Ward, 57, American baseball player (San Diego Padres), brain cancer.
Wally Yamaguchi, 60, Japanese professional wrestling manager (AJPW, FMW, WWF), stroke.

10
Edith Borroff, 93, American musicologist and composer.
Anton Buteyko, 71, Ukrainian diplomat, Ambassador to the United States (1998–1999) and Romania (2000–2003).
Karl Eller, 91, American advertising executive and retailer (Circle K).
Josef Feistmantl, 80, Austrian luger, Olympic (1964), world (1969), and European (1967) champion.
Russell Gary, 59, American football player (New Orleans Saints, Philadelphia Eagles), heart attack.
Raven Grimassi, 67, American Wiccan priest and writer, pancreatic cancer.
Louis Hailey, 93, Australian Olympic hockey player (1956, 1960).
Charlie Karp, 65, American musician, songwriter and Emmy-winning documentarian.
İrsen Küçük, 79, Cypriot politician, Prime Minister of Northern Cyprus (2010–2013), heart attack.
Britta Lindmark, 89, Swedish Olympic skater (1952).
Gordon McIntosh, 93, Scottish-born Australian politician, Senator (1974–1987).
Eric Moss, 44, American football player (Minnesota Vikings, Scottish Claymores).
Charles Mutschler, 63, American archivist, traffic collision.
Gheorghe Naghi, 86, Romanian film director (Telegrame).
William Powers Jr., 72, American educator, President of the University of Texas at Austin (2006–2015), complications from a fall.
Al Silverman, 92, American sports writer.
Alekos Spanoudakis, 91, Greek basketball player (Olympiacos).
Paul Talalay, 95, German-born American pharmacologist, congestive heart failure.
René Arnold Valero, 88, American Roman Catholic prelate, Auxiliary Bishop of Brooklyn, New York (1980–2005).
Notable people who died in the Ethiopian Airlines Flight 302 plane crash:
Pius Adesanmi, 47, Nigerian-Canadian professor and writer.
Christine Alalo, 48–49, Ugandan police officer and peacekeeper (AMISOM).
Sebastiano Tusa, 66, Italian archaeologist and politician.

11
Dave Aron, 54, American music producer.
Yona Atari, 85, Israeli singer and actress (Rechov Sumsum), Alzheimer's disease.
Danny Ben-Israel, 75, Israeli musician.
Hal Blaine, 90, American Hall of Fame drummer (The Wrecking Crew).
Martín Chirino, 94, Spanish sculptor.
John Dawson, 91, New Zealand botanist and academic (Victoria University of Wellington).
Willie Ellison, 73, American football player (Los Angeles Rams, Kansas City Chiefs).
Desmond Ford, 90, Australian evangelical theologian.
Leetsch C. Hsu, 98, Chinese mathematician and educator.
Saiful Azam Kashem, 71, Bangladeshi film director.
Dzhemal Kherhadze, 74, Georgian footballer (Torpedo Kutaisi).
Pertti Koivulahti, 67, Finnish ice hockey player (Tappara).
Danny Kustow, 63, English rock guitarist (Tom Robinson Band), pneumonia and liver infection.
Joe Rosenblatt, 85, Canadian poet.
Edward Rubenstein, 94, American physician.
Patrick Ruttle, 88, Canadian Olympic field hockey player (1964).
Sundar Lal Tiwari, 61, Indian politician, MLA (since 2013), heart attack.
*Antônio Wilson Vieira Honório, 75, Brazilian football player (Santos, national team) and manager (Valeriodoce), world champion (1962), heart attack.
Speros Vryonis, 90, American historian.
*Peter Wong Man-kong, 70, Hong Kong shipping magnate and politician, member of the National People's Congress (since 1993).
Xing Shizhong, 80, Chinese general, President of the PLA National Defence University (1995–2002).

12
John Bardo, 70, American educator, president of Wichita State University (since 2012), lung disease.
Jim Beatty, 84, American jazz musician.
Věra Bílá, 64, Czech singer, heart attack.
Stu Briese, 72, Canadian politician, MLA (2007–2016).
Thomas S. Carter, 97, American engineer, president of the Kansas City Southern Railway (1973–1986).
Renato Cipollini, 73, Italian football player (SPAL, Atalanta) and executive, president of Bologna (2001–2004).
Günter Dreyer, 75, German Egyptologist.
Karl Fischer, 70, Hungarian-born Canadian architect.
Joachim Mbadu Kikhela Kupika, 87, Congolese Roman Catholic prelate, Bishop of Boma (1975–2001).
John Kilzer, 62, American singer and songwriter, suicide by hanging.
Shelly Liebowitz, 73, American record executive, promoter, producer, and manager.
Alberto Lois, 62, Dominican baseball player (Pittsburgh Pirates).
Tom Meyer, 96, American basketball player (Detroit Gems).
Joseph C. Miller, 79, American historian.
Eurico Miranda, 74, Brazilian football chairman (Vasco da Gama) and politician, Deputy (1995–2002).
Gabriela Moser, 64, Austrian politician, MP (1994–1996, 1997–2017).
Alan Moss, 88, English cricketer (Middlesex, MCC, national team).
Hermann Mucke, 84, Austrian astronomer, founder and editor of Sternenbote.
Sir John Richardson, 95, British art historian and Picasso biographer.
Marjorie W. Sharmat, 90, American author, respiratory failure.
Tom Skjønberg, 70, Norwegian sailor.
Joffre Stewart, 93, American beat poet and anarchist.

13
Keith Butler, 80, British racing cyclist.
Frank Cali, 53, American mobster, head of Gambino crime family (since 2015), shot.
Edmund Capon, 78, British-born Australian art historian and curator, director of the Art Gallery of New South Wales (1978–2011), melanoma.
Zofia Czerwińska, 85, Polish actress (A Generation, Ashes and Diamonds, The Pianist).
Beril Dedeoğlu, 57, Turkish politician and academic, Minister of European Union Affairs (2015), brain hemorrhage.
Zagorka Golubović, 89, Serbian anthropologist and philosopher.
Howard Hibbett, 98, American translator.
Chuck Holmes, 84, Canadian ice hockey player (Detroit Red Wings).
Harry Hughes, 92, American politician, Governor of Maryland (1979–1987), member of the Maryland House of Delegates (1955–1959) and Senate (1959–1971).
Ghazali Jaafar, 75, Filipino militant (Moro Islamic Liberation Front) and politician, Speaker of the Bangsamoro Parliament (since 2019), kidney failure.
Demie Mainieri, 90, American Hall of Fame baseball coach (Miami Dade College).
Ken McKinnon, 82, Canadian politician, Commissioner of Yukon (1986–1995), member of the Yukon Territorial Council (1961–1964, 1967–1978).
Joseph Hanson Kwabena Nketia, 97, Ghanaian ethnomusicologist and composer.
David Palladini, 72, American illustrator.
Andrea Pollack, 57, German swimmer, Olympic champion (1976, 1980), cancer.
Charles Sanna, 101, American inventor.
Maggie Shaddick, 92, Canadian scout leader.
Leroy Stanton, 72, American baseball player (New York Mets, California Angels, Seattle Mariners), traffic collision.

14
Paul Adams, 82, American football player and coach (Deerfield High School).
Kurt Armbruster, 84, Swiss footballer (Lausanne, national team).
Birch Bayh, 91, American politician, U.S. Senator (1963–1981), member (1954–1962) and Speaker (1958–1960) of the Indiana House of Representatives, pneumonia.
Rosamma Chacko, 91, Indian politician, MLA (1982–1997).
Godfried Danneels, 85, Belgian Roman Catholic cardinal, Archbishop of Mechelen-Brussels (1979–2010).
Terry Donahue, 93, Canadian baseball player (Peoria Redwings).
Thomas Goddard, 81, Polish-born New Zealand jurist, Chief Employment Court Judge (1989–2005).
Marian Sulzberger Heiskell, 100, American newspaper executive.
Harry Helenius, 72, Finnish diplomat, ambassador to Russia (2004–2008) and Sweden (2011–2014).
Henry S. Horn, 77, American ecologist.
Paul Hutchins, 73, British tennis player, amyotrophic lateral sclerosis.
Joe Knowland, 88, American actor (Escape from Alcatraz, Little Miss Marker) and newspaper publisher (Oakland Tribune).
Masahiko Kobe, 49, Japanese chef, fall.
Pat Laffan, 79, Irish actor (Father Ted, The Snapper).
Mate Mahadevi, 74, Indian Hindu sect leader, author and Lingayatism activist, sepsis.
Ralph Metzner, 82, American psychologist.
Ilona Novák, 93, Hungarian swimmer, Olympic champion (1952).
Onigu Otite, 80, Nigerian sociologist.
Sir Stanley Peart, 96, British medical researcher.
Jake Phelps, 56, American skateboarder and magazine editor (Thrasher).
Anita Silvers, 78, American philosopher.
Lester Smith, 76, American oil executive.
Charlie Whiting, 66, British motorsports director, FIA Formula 1 race director (since 1997), pulmonary embolism.
Haig Young, 90, Canadian politician.

15
Luca Alinari, 75, Italian painter.
Juan Manuel Arza Muñuzuri, 86, Spanish politician, President of the Government of Navarre (1980–1984).
Tone Brulin, 92, Belgian stage director.
Derek Burke, 89, British academic.
Alec Coppen, 96, British psychiatrist.
Atta Elayyan, 33, Kuwaiti-born New Zealand footballer (national futsal team) and IT entrepreneur, shot.
Okwui Enwezor, 55, Nigerian art critic and writer, curator of the Venice Biennale (2015), multiple myeloma.
Bengt Gustafsson, 85, Swedish military officer, Supreme Commander of the Armed Forces (1986–1994).
Sara Payne Hayden, 99, American WWII WASP pilot.
John P. Healey, 97, American aerospace executive.
Leif Henriksson, 75, Swedish ice hockey player (Frölunda HC).
Dave Hood Jr., 64, American politician, member of the Florida House of Representatives (2012–2014), brain cancer.
Lam Jones, 60, American sprinter and football player (New York Jets, Dallas Cowboys), Olympic champion (1976), myeloma.
Osmo Jussila, 81, Finnish historian.
Helena Khan, 91, Bangladeshi children's writer.
Wiesław Kilian, 66, Polish politician, member of the Sejm (2005–2007, 2010–2011), Senator (since 2011).
Rudi Krausmann, 85, Austrian-born Australian poet and playwright.
Derek Lewin, 88, English footballer (Bishop Auckland, Great Britain Olympic football team).
Günther Lohre, 65, German Olympic athlete (1976).
Luo Jye, 94, Taiwanese billionaire businessman, founder of Cheng Shin Rubber.
W. S. Merwin, 91, American poet, Pulitzer Prize winner (1971, 2009), United States Poet Laureate.
Dominique Noguez, 76, French writer, Prix Femina winner (1997).
Maya Rani Paul, 86, Indian politician.
Ron Peplow, 83, English footballer (Brentford).
Norman A. Phillips, 95, American meteorologist.
Y. S. Vivekananda Reddy, 68, Indian politician, member of the Lok Sabha (1999–2009), stabbed.
Jean-Pierre Richard, 96, French literary critic.
Ezequiel Santiago, 45, American politician, member of the Connecticut House of Representatives (since 2009), heart attack.
Lothar Schneider, 79, German wrestler, world championship bronze medalist (1965).
Gerhard Skiba, 71, Austrian politician, mayor of Braunau am Inn (1989–2010).
Mike Thalassitis, 26, English-born Cypriot footballer (Boreham Wood, Ebbsfleet United) and reality show personality (Love Island), suicide by hanging.

16
Michael Axworthy, 56, British academic and author, cancer.
Timothy A. Barrow, 85, American politician, member of the Arizona House of Representatives (1966–1973), Mayor of Phoenix (1974–1976), Alzheimer's disease and cancer.
Ian Brown, 93, Australian football player (Geelong).
Catherine Callaghan, 87, American linguist and anti-abortion activist, co-founder of Feminists for Life.
Mordaunt Cohen, 102, British soldier and solicitor, AJEX chairman.
Dick Dale, 81, American guitarist and surf music pioneer ("Let's Go Trippin'", "Misirlou"), heart failure.
Larry DiTillio, 71, American television writer (He-Man and the Masters of the Universe, Beast Wars: Transformers, Babylon 5).
Richard Erdman, 93, American actor (Community, Stalag 17, Tora! Tora! Tora!).
Joe Fafard, 76, Canadian sculptor, stomach cancer.
Barbara Hammer, 79, American filmmaker (Nitrate Kisses, Tender Fictions), ovarian cancer.
Tom Hatten, 92, American actor (The Secret of NIMH, Spies Like Us) and media personality (KTLA).
Gilbert Hottois, 72, Belgian philosopher.
Yann-Fañch Kemener, 61, French singer.
Amos Kloner, 79, Israeli archaeologist.
Alan Krueger, 58, American economist, suicide.
Mohamed Mahmoud Ould Louly, 76, Mauritanian military officer and politician, Chairman of the Military Committee for National Salvation (1979–1980).
Johann Maier, 85, Austrian talmudic scholar.
Howard Morgan, 87, Welsh cricketer (Glamorgan).
Yulia Nachalova, 38, Russian singer, actress and television presenter, cerebral edema.
Grozdana Olujić, 84, Serbian writer.
Stephen Rolfe Powell, 67, American glass artist.
David White, 79, American singer-songwriter (Danny & the Juniors, The Spokesmen).
Sir William Whitfield, 98, British architect.

17
Hanne Aga, 71, Norwegian poet.
Ken Bald, 98, American illustrator and comic book artist (Dr. Kildare).
Barbara Benary, 72, American composer and ethnomusicologist, Parkinson's disease.
Ulf Bengtsson, 59, Swedish table tennis player.
Bill Burlison, 88, American politician, member of the U.S. House of Representatives for Missouri's 10th district (1969–1981).
Mick Carley, 78, Irish Gaelic footballer (Westmeath).
Shahed Chowdhury, 53, Bangladeshi film director.
René Fontès, 77, French rugby union executive and politician, president of ASM Clermont Auvergne (2004–2013), mayor of Eygalières (since 2008), heart attack.
Víctor Genes, 57, Paraguayan football player (Cerro Porteño) and manager (Trinidense, national team), heart attack.
Norman Hollyn, 66, American film and television editor (Heathers, Wild Palms, The Equalizer), coronary embolism and cardiac arrest.
Jorge Insunza Becker, 82, Chilean engineer and politician, Deputy (1969–1973).
Olavi Mannonen, 89, Finnish modern pentathlete, Olympic silver medalist (1956) and bronze medalist (1952, 1956).
João Carlos Marinho, 83, Brazilian writer (O Gênio do Crime)
Paul-André Massé, 71, Canadian politician.
Wolfgang Meyer, 64, German clarinetist, cancer.
Mick Murphy, 77, English rugby player (St Helens, Leigh).
José Musalem Saffie, 94, Chilean politician, Senator (1965–1973) and Deputy (1953–1965).
Manohar Parrikar, 63, Indian politician, MP (2014–2017), Minister of Defence (2014–2017) and Chief Minister of Goa (2000–2005, 2012–2014, since 2017), pancreatic cancer.
Chinmoy Roy, 79, Indian actor (Goopy Gyne Bagha Byne, Ekhoni, Subarna Golak), heart attack.
Richie Ryan, 90, Irish politician, Teachta Dála (1959–1982), MEP (1973–1977, 1979–1982) and Minister for Finance (1973–1977).
Bernie Tormé, 66, Irish guitarist, singer and songwriter (Gillan, Guy McCoy Tormé, Desperado), pneumonia.
Yuya Uchida, 79, Japanese singer (Flower Travellin' Band) and actor (Merry Christmas, Mr. Lawrence, Black Rain), pneumonia.
Andre Williams, 82, American R&B singer and songwriter ("Shake a Tail Feather"), colon cancer.
Tunku Puan Zanariah, 78, Malaysian royal, Raja Permaisuri Agong (1984–1989).

18
Egon Balas, 96, Romanian mathematician.
György Baló, 71, Hungarian broadcaster.
Vlastimil Brlica, 90, Czech Olympic athlete.
John Carl Buechler, 66, American visual effects artist and film director (Troll, Friday the 13th Part VII: The New Blood, Hatchet), prostate cancer.
Marcel-Pierre Cléach, 86, French politician, Senator (1995–2014), mayor of Lombron (1995–2011).
Jerrie Cobb, 88, American aviator.
Louise Erickson, 91, American radio and film actress.
Jackie Fahey, 91, Irish politician, Teachta Dála (1965–1992).
William Haye, 70, Jamaican cricketer, shot.
Tova Ilan, 89, Israeli politician, member of the Knesset (2006).
Roger Kirby, 79, American professional wrestler (CSW, WWA, NWA Mid-America), pneumonia.
Dessie Larkin, 49, Irish politician.
Pavel Machotka, 82, Czechoslovakian-born American psychologist and painter, complications from a stroke.
Karl-Heinz Mrosko, 72, German footballer (Bayern Munich, Hannover 96, Arminia Hannover), pancreatitis and pneumonia.
Lorenzo Orsetti, 33, Italian volunteer soldier, shot.
Pioneerof the Nile, 13, American racing thoroughbred, heart attack.
Giovanni Sgro, 88, Italian-born Australian politician, MLC (1979–1992).
Bomma Venkateshwar, 78, Indian politician, MLA (1999–2004).

19
Derek Anthony, 71, British military officer, Flag Officer Scotland, Northern England and Northern Ireland (2000–2003).
Graham Arnold, 86, English artist.
Arthur Bartman, 46, South African footballer (Kaizer Chiefs, Maritzburg United).
Mona Lee Brock, 87, American educator and crisis support counsellor, heart failure.
Boris Dubrovin, 68, Russian mathematician, amyotrophic lateral sclerosis.
Thanasis Giannakopoulos, 88, Greek pharmaceutical and sports executive (Vianex S.A., Panathinaikos A.O.).
Tony Greenfield, 87, British statistician.
Clinton Greyn, 85, Welsh actor (Compact, Goodbye, Mr. Chips, Doctor Who).
Chuck Harmon, 94, American baseball player (Cincinnati Redlegs, St. Louis Cardinals).
Rose Hilton, 87, British painter.
Marlen Khutsiev, 93, Georgian-born Russian film director (I Am Twenty, July Rain, Infinitas), People's Artist of the USSR (1986).
George W. Lindberg, 86, American judge, Senior Judge of the United States District Court for the Northern District of Illinois (2001–2012).
Brenda Muntemba, 48, Zambian diplomat, High Commissioner to Kenya, complications from a traffic collision.
Genevieve Oswald, 97, American dance scholar and curator (New York Public Library).
Bill Phelps, 84, American politician, Lieutenant Governor of Missouri (1972–1980).
Maurílio Jorge Quintal de Gouveia, 86, Portuguese Roman Catholic prelate, Bishop of Évora (1981–2008).
Astri Riddervold, 93, Norwegian chemist and ethnologist.
S. B. Sinha, 74, Indian judge.
Ian Thorogood, 82, Australian football player (Melbourne) and coach (Carlton).
Kenneth To, 26, Hong Kong-born Australian swimmer, FINA Swimming World Cup overall winner (2012), Youth Olympics champion (2010), cardiac arrest.

20
Joseph Victor Adamec, 83, American Roman Catholic prelate, Bishop of Altoona–Johnstown (1987–2011).
Anatoly Adoskin, 91, Russian actor (Seven Old Men and a Girl, The Brothers Karamazov, Moscow-Cassiopeia), People's Artist of the Russian Federation (1996).
Dennis Anderson, 69, Canadian politician, MLA for Calgary-Currie (1979–1993).
Betty G. Bailey, 79, American artist.
Eunetta T. Boone, 63, American television writer and producer (One on One, Raven's Home, The Hughleys), heart attack.
Joaquín Calomarde, 62, Spanish teacher and politician, Deputy (2000–2008).
Linda Gregg, 76, American poet.
Nobuhiko Higashikuni, 74, Japanese Imperial prince.
Noel Hush, 94, Australian chemist.
Randy Jackson, 93, American baseball player (Chicago Cubs, Brooklyn/Los Angeles Dodgers, Cleveland Indians).
Donald Kalpokas, 75, ni-Vanuatu politician, Prime Minister (1991, 1998–1999).
Panos Koutrouboussis, 82, Greek writer and artist.
Georg Kreutzberg, 86, German neurobiologist.
Antonio Menegazzo, 87, Italian Roman Catholic prelate, Apostolic Administrator of El Obeid (1996–2010).
Terje Nilsen, 67, Norwegian singer-songwriter.
Hans Günter Nöcker, 92, German bass-baritone singer.
Lance Oswald, 82, Australian footballer (St Kilda).
Ralph Solecki, 101, American archaeologist.
John Steeples, 59, English footballer (Grimsby Town, Scarborough).
A. Subramaniam, 93, Indian politician, MLA (1971–1977).
Keyvan Vahdani, 27, Iranian footballer (Paykan), landslide.
Mary Warnock, Baroness Warnock, 94, British philosopher.
Leonard Wolf, 96, Romanian-born American poet.

21
John Bersia, 62, American writer.
Anna Maria Canopi, 87, Italian Benedictine abbess and spiritual writer.
Mike Cofer, 58, American football player (Detroit Lions), amyloidosis.
Marcel Detienne, 83, Belgian historian.
Anthony Dickerson, 61, American football player (Dallas Cowboys), injuries sustained in a fall.
Doris Duke, 77, American soul and gospel singer.
Gordon Hill, 90, English football referee.
Adzil Holder, 87, Barbadian cricketer.
R. Kanagaraj, 66, Indian politician, cardiac arrest.
Roger Moore, 79, American computer scientist and philanthropist.
Gonzalo Portocarrero, 69, Peruvian sociologist, lung cancer.
Francis Quinn, 97, American Roman Catholic prelate, Bishop of Sacramento (1980–1993).
K. G. Rajasekharan, 72, Indian Malayalam film director.
Haku Shah, 85, Indian artist, cardiac arrest.
Balwant Singh, 82, Indian politician, secretary of Punjab Communist Party of India (Marxist) (1998–2008), MLA (1980–1985).
Paul Kouassivi Vieira, 69, Beninese Roman Catholic prelate, Bishop of Djougou (since 1995).
Franco Wanyama, 51, Ugandan Olympic boxer.
Pyotr Zaychenko, 75, Russian film and theater actor (Planet Parade, Taxi Blues, Leningrad 46).

22
Jack Absalom, 91, Australian painter and adventurer.
Frans Andriessen, 89, Dutch politician, Minister of Finance (1977–1980), European Commissioner (1981–1993).
Dino De Antoni, 82, Italian Roman Catholic prelate, Archbishop of Gorizia (1999–2012).
Prudent Carpentier, 97, Canadian politician, member of the National Assembly of Quebec (1970–1976).
John Duignan, 73, Scottish comedy writer, motor neurone disease.
Joe Hall, 71, Canadian singer-songwriter, liver cancer.
June Harding, 81, American actress (The Trouble with Angels, The Richard Boone Show, Matt Lincoln).
Victor Hochhauser, 95, Slovak-born British music promoter.
César Lévano, 92, Peruvian journalist and teacher.
Hugh T. Lightsey, 93, American politician, member of the South Carolina House of Representatives (1965–1971).
Keyonta Marshall, 37, American football player (Philadelphia Eagles, Hamburg Sea Devils), cancer.
Tom Maxwell, 94, British military officer.
Art Mazmanian, 91, American baseball player and manager (Newark Orioles, Oneonta Yankees).
Bobby McCool, 76, Scottish footballer (Cheltenham Town, Gloucester City).
Denzil Meuli, 92, New Zealand writer, newspaper editor (Zealandia), and Roman Catholic priest.
Charles A. Miller, 81, American political scientist, oropharyngeal and esophageal dysphagia.
Jim Moody, 83, American politician, member of the U.S. House of Representatives for Wisconsin's 5th (1983–1993), Wisconsin State Senate (1979–1982) and Wisconsin State Assembly.
Arlen Ness, 79, American motorcycle designer and entrepreneur.
Behrouz Rahbar, 73, Iranian Olympic racing cyclist (1972).
C. S. Shivalli, 58, Indian politician, heart attack.
Scott Walker, 76, American-born British singer-songwriter (The Walker Brothers), composer and record producer.
Zinka Zorko, 84, Slovenian linguist, dialectologist and academic, member of Slovenian Academy of Sciences and Arts (since 2003).

23
Kate Baxter, 88, Australian Olympic fencer.
Philomena Canning, 59, Irish midwife and women's health advocate, ovarian cancer.
Tudor Caranfil, 87, Romanian film critic.
Lina Cheryazova, 50, Uzbek freestyle skier, Olympic champion (1994).
Larry Cohen, 82, American film director (It's Alive, The Stuff) and screenwriter (Phone Booth).
Clem Daniels, 81, American football player (Oakland Raiders).
Vinjamuri Anasuya Devi, 98, Indian singer and composer.
Jacques Dessemme, 93, French Olympic basketball player (1952).
Denise DuBarry, 63, American actress (Black Sheep Squadron, Being There, Monster in the Closet), producer and marketer, fungal infection.
Rafi Eitan, 92, Israeli intelligence officer and politician, member of the Knesset (2006–2009) and Minister for Senior Citizens (2006–2009).
James Carroll Fox, 90, American senior judge, U.S. District Judge for Eastern North Carolina (1982–2017).
Hal King, 75, American baseball player (Houston Astros, Atlanta Braves, Cincinnati Reds).
Ferd Lahure, 89, Luxembourgian footballer (national team).
Matti Launonen, 74, Finnish table tennis player, Paralympic champion (1992, 1996), complications from a fall.
Howard V. Lee, 85, American soldier, Medal of Honor recipient.
Lee Shi-chi, 81, Taiwanese artist.
Li Fulin, 59, Chinese police official and politician, Vice Governor of Hainan Province.
Shahnaz Rahmatullah, 67, Bangladeshi singer, heart attack.
René Remangeon, 87, French racing cyclist.
Finn Willy Sørensen, 77, Danish footballer (Boldklubben Frem, Washington Whips).

24
Reynaldo Aguinaldo, 70, Filipino politician, Mayor of Kawit (2007–2016), cardiac arrest.
Andrew Browder, 88, American mathematician.
Pancracio Celdrán, 77, Spanish professor and journalist.
Anna Cohn, 68, American museum director and Judaic scholar.
Ayanda Denge, South African transgender and anti-sex trafficking activist, stabbed.
Erik Fjeldstad, 75, Norwegian ice hockey player (national team).
Alan H. Friedman, 91, American writer.
Nancy Gates, 93, American actress (Masterson of Kansas, World Without End, Magnificent Roughnecks).
Joe Harvard, 60, American musician, liver cancer.
Ensio Hyytiä, 81, Finnish Olympic ski jumper (1960, 1964), world championship silver medalist (1958).
Noah Keen, 98, American actor (Arrest and Trial, Battle for the Planet of the Apes, Tom Sawyer).
Vicky Kippin, 76, Australian politician, Queensland MLA (1974–1980).
Julia Lockwood, 77, British actress (My Teenage Daughter, Please Turn Over, No Kidding), pneumonia.
Finn Lowery, 28, New Zealand water polo player (national team), suicide.
Michael Lynne, 77, American studio executive (New Line Cinema) and film producer (The Lord of the Rings, A Nightmare on Elm Street).
Brian MacArthur, 79, British newspaper editor and writer, leukaemia.
Fred Malek, 82, American executive (Marriott Corporation, Coldwell Banker, Northwest Airlines), political campaigner and philanthropist.
Mich Matsudaira, 81, American businessman and civil rights activist.
Desmond Dudwa Phiri, 88, Malawian historian and economist.
Joseph Pilato, 70, American actor (Day of the Dead, Pulp Fiction, Digimon: The Movie).
Ronald K. Siegel, 76, American psychopharmacologist.
Robert W. Sweet, 96, American senior judge, U.S. District Judge for Southern New York (since 1978).

25
Edna Barker, 82, English cricketer (national team).
Ordell Braase, 87, American football player (Baltimore Colts), complications from Alzheimer's disease.
Virgilio Caballero Pedraza, 77, Mexican journalist and politician, MP (2015–2018).
Paul Dawkins, 61, American-Turkish basketball player (Utah Jazz, Galatasaray).
Eduardo De Santis, 89, Italian actor and philanthropist.
Len Fontaine, 71, Canadian ice hockey player (Detroit Red Wings).
Barrie Hole, 76, Welsh footballer (Cardiff City, Aston Villa, national team).
Adolph Lawrence, 50, Liberian politician, member of the House of Representatives (since 2012), traffic collision.
Miklós Martin, 87, Hungarian Olympic water polo player.
Antonio Napoletano, 81, Italian Roman Catholic prelate, Bishop of Sessa Aurunca (1994–2013).
Julian Nott, 74, British balloonist and scientist.
Susan Nutter, 74–75, American librarian.
Gabriel Okara, 97, Nigerian poet and novelist.
Jean Price, 75, American politician, member of the Montana House of Representatives (2011–2019), pancreatic cancer.
Cal Ramsey, 81, American basketball player (St. Louis Hawks, New York Knicks, Syracuse Nationals), heart attack.
Sofía Rocha, 51, Peruvian actress, fall.
Dorothy Rowe, 88, Australian psychologist and writer.
Jerry Schypinski, 87, American baseball player (Kansas City Athletics).
Sydel Silverman, 86, American anthropologist.
Archbishop Stylianos of Australia, 83, Australian Greek Orthodox prelate, Archbishop of Australia (since 1975).
Bill Thompson III, 57, American ornithologist and publisher (Bird Watcher's Digest), pancreatic cancer.
Lyle Tuttle, 87, American tattoo artist.

26
Ralph Allen, 92, Canadian painter.
Michel Bacos, 95, French pilot (Air France Flight 139).
Ted Burgin, 91, English football player (Sheffield United, Leeds United, Rochdale) and manager.
François Dubanchet, 95, French politician.
Catherine R. Gira, 86, American educator and university administrator.
Kenichi Hagiwara, 68, Japanese actor and singer, gastrointestinal stromal tumor.
Rafael Henzel, 45, Brazilian sports broadcaster, survivor of LaMia Flight 2933 crash, heart attack.
Immanuel Kauluma Elifas, 86, Namibian royal, Chief of Ondonga (since 1975).
Andrew Marshall, 97, American military and diplomatic advisor, director of Office of Net Assessment (1973–2015).
Master Fatman, 53, Danish comedian, film director (Gayniggers from Outer Space) and singer.
Bronco McLoughlin, 80, Irish stuntman (Indiana Jones and the Temple of Doom, Star Wars, Superman).
Ali Mema, 76, Albanian footballer (Tirana, national team) and manager.
Nodar Mgaloblishvili, 87, Georgian actor (Centaurs, Formula of Love, Katala).
James F. Nagle, 91, American politician, member of the New York State Assembly (1977–1992).
Arthur Porter, 95, Sierra Leonean historian.
W. H. Pugmire, 67, American writer.
Ranking Roger, 56, British singer (The Beat, General Public), cancer.
Redoute's Choice, 22, Australian Thoroughbred racehorse and champion sire, euthanised.
Isidro Sala Ribera, 86, Spanish-born Peruvian Roman Catholic prelate, Bishop of Abancay (1992–2009).
N. Selvaraj, 75, Indian politician, member of Lok Sabha (1980–1984).
Tejshree Thapa, 52, Nepalese human rights lawyer, multiple organ failure.
Heinz Winbeck, 73, German composer.

27
Friedrich Achleitner, 88, Austrian poet and architecture critic.
Ashitha, 62, Indian writer, cancer.
Joe Bellino, 81, American football player (Naval Academy, Boston Patriots), Heisman Trophy winner (1960).
Dragan Bošnjak, 62, Serbian footballer (Spartak Subotica, Vojvodina, Dinamo Zagreb).
Pierre Bourguignon, 77, French politician, Deputy (1981–1993, 1997–2012), mayor of Sotteville-lès-Rouen (1989–2014), heart attack.
John Browne, 82, Irish politician, Senator (1983–1987) and TD (1989–2002).
Valery Bykovsky, 84, Russian cosmonaut (Vostok 5, Soyuz 22, Soyuz 31).
Roy Eugene Davis, 88, American spiritual teacher, heart failure.
Abdul Latif Dayfallah, 89, Yemeni military officer and politician, Prime Minister (1963, 1975).
Edit Doron, 68, Israeli linguist.
Jan Dydak, 50, Polish boxer, Olympic bronze medalist (1988), cancer.
Valentino Giambelli, 91, Italian football player (Olginatese, Monza, Gallaratese) and executive, Chairman of Monza (1980–2000).
Yoji Harada, 46, Japanese tattoo artist and reality show personality (Miami Ink).
Jan Kobylański, 95, Polish-Paraguayan union leader and stamp printer.
Akihito Kondo, 80, Japanese baseball player.
Prasanta Kumar Majumdar, 78, Indian politician.
John Permal, 72, Pakistani sprinter, pancreatic cancer.
Dimitri Polizos, 68, American politician, member of the Alabama House of Representatives (since 2013), heart attack.
Marvin E. Proffer, 88, American politician, member of the Missouri House of Representatives (1962–1986).
P. J. G. Ransom, 83, Scottish author.
Lawrence Rhodes, 79, American dancer and ballet director.
Bruce Yardley, 71, Australian Test cricketer, cancer.

28
Vladimir Basalayev, 73, Russian football player (Lokomotiv Moscow, Dynamo Moscow, USSR national team) and manager.
Jonathan Baumbach, 85, American author, academic, and film critic.
Bill Culbert, 84, New Zealand artist.
Alphonse D'Arco, 86, American mobster, acting boss of the Lucchese crime family (1990–1991), kidney disease. (death announced on this date)
Ralph Fertig, 89, American social justice activist, lawyer and author.
Domenico Giannace, 94, Italian trade unionist and politician, member of the Regional Council of Basilicata (1980–1985).
John Harris, 83, English cricketer (Somerset).
Klaus Koch, 92, German biblical scholar.
Pierre Lacroix, 84, French rugby union player.
Maury Laws, 95, American television and film composer (Rudolph the Red-Nosed Reindeer, Frosty the Snowman, The Little Drummer Boy).
Ian McDonald, 82, Scottish civil servant.
Koji Nakanishi, 93, Japanese chemist.
Kevin Randall, 73, English football player and manager (Chesterfield, York City).
Damir Salimov, 81, Uzbek film director.
Eva Mae Fleming Scott, 92, American politician, member of the Virginia House of Delegates (1972–1979) and Senate (1980–1984).
Fuyumi Shiraishi, 82, Japanese voice actress (Mobile Suit Gundam, Patalliro!, The Monster Kid), heart failure.
Garry Sidebottom, 64, Australian VFL footballer (St Kilda, Geelong, Fitzroy), cancer.
Jon Skolmen, 78, Norwegian actor (Sällskapsresan, Hodet over vannet).
Bob Stewart, 79, British radio presenter (Radio Luxembourg).
Henry Stern, 83, American politician and government official, member of NYCC (1974–1983), Commissioner of NYC Parks (1983–1990, 1994–2000), complications of Parkinson's disease.
Wong Tien Fatt, 64, Malaysian politician, MP (since 2013), heart attack.
Steve Wormith, 72, Canadian football player (Montreal Alouettes) and psychologist, cancer.

29
Mark Alessi, 65, American comic book publisher, founder of CrossGen.
Satish Kumar Chauhan, 58, Indian politician, MLA (1985–1990), heart attack.
Allan Cole, 75, American author and television writer.
Srima Dissanayake, 76, Sri Lankan lawyer and politician.
Anders Ehnmark, 87, Swedish author and journalist (Expressen, Norrskensflamman, Folket i Bild/Kulturfront).
Joe Enook, 61, Canadian politician, member (since 2011) and Speaker of the Legislative Assembly of Nunavut (since 2017).
Dobrica Erić, 82, Serbian writer and poet.
Josep Esteve i Soler, 89, Spanish pharmaceutical executive.
Paul D.K. Fraser, 78, Canadian jurist, president of the Canadian Bar Association (1981–1982) and the Commonwealth Lawyers Association (1993–1996).
Kenneth A. Gibson, 86, American politician, mayor of Newark, New Jersey (1970–1986).
Angeline Gunathilake, 79, Sri Lankan singer.
Samantha Heath, 58, British politician, member of the London Assembly (2000–2004).
Joshua Hecht, 91, American operatic bass.
Tao Ho, 82, Hong Kong architect (Hong Kong Arts Centre) and designer of the flag of Hong Kong, pneumonia.
Jim Holt, 74, American baseball player (Minnesota Twins, Oakland Athletics).
Jon Østeng Hov, 83, Norwegian photographer and writer.
Harry Kesten, 87, German-born American mathematician.
Margaret Lewis, 79, American singer-songwriter ("The Girl Most Likely", "Reconsider Me"), pneumonia.
Shane Rimmer, 89, Canadian-born British actor (Thunderbirds, Dr. Strangelove, The Spy Who Loved Me).
Agnès Varda, 90, French film director (Cléo from 5 to 7, Le Bonheur, Vagabond), cancer.
Ed Westcott, 97, American photographer (Manhattan Project).

30
Mary Bayliss, 79, English magistrate, High Sheriff (2005–2006) and Lord Lieutenant of Berkshire (2008–2015).
Greg Booker, 58, American baseball player (San Diego Padres, Minnesota Twins, San Francisco Giants), melanoma.
John Brown, 83, British rugby union player (Harlequins, British Lions) and Olympic bobsledder (1968).
Paloma Cela, 76, Spanish actress (Forty Degrees in the Shade, Cry Chicago, The Legion Like Women), stroke.
Ron Elvidge, 96, New Zealand rugby union player (Otago, national team).
Maurice Hardouin, 71, French footballer.
Geoff Harvey, 83, Australian musician and music director (The Mike Walsh Show, Midday).
Truman Lowe, 75, American artist.
Simaro Lutumba, 81, Congolese musician (TPOK Jazz).
Tania Mallet, 77, English model and actress (Goldfinger).
John Wilson Moore, 98, American biophysicist.
David Paintin, 88, British obstetrician and gynaecologist.
Lasse Petterson, 83, Swedish actor.
Havel Rowe, 90, Australian VFL footballer (Richmond).
Jim Russell, 98, English racing driver.
Michele Russo, 74, Italian Roman Catholic prelate, Bishop of Doba (1989–2014).
Ruben Tovmasyan, 82, Armenian politician, First Secretary of the Armenian Communist Party (2005–2014).
Virginia Uribe, 85, American educator and LGBT advocate.
Ben West Jr., 78, American politician, member of the Tennessee House of Representatives (1985–2011).

31
Peter Coleman, 90, Australian politician and writer, Leader of the New South Wales Opposition (1977–1978), member of the House of Representatives (1981–1987).
Britt Damberg, 82, Swedish singer.
Cesare Dujany, 99, Italian politician, MP (1979–1996), President of Aosta Valley (1970–1974).
Natalia Fileva, 55, Russian business executive (S7 Airlines), plane crash.
Charles Foster, 65, American Olympic hurdler (1976).
Ralph S. Greco, 76, American surgeon, prostate cancer.
José Antonio Gurriarán, 80, Spanish journalist.
Corrado Hérin, 52, Italian luger and mountain bike racer, plane crash.
Liz Howe, 59, British ecologist, cancer.
Nipsey Hussle, 33, American rapper ("Last Time That I Checc'd", "Racks in the Middle"), shot.
Jake Jaeckel, 76, American baseball player (Chicago Cubs).
Frank Jonik, 61, Canadian snooker player.
Joseph Levi, 95, American politician, member of the Pennsylvania House of Representatives (1975–1984).
John J. Maurer, 96, American politician, member of the Wisconsin State Senate (1975–1985).
Eva Moser, 36, Austrian chess player, leukaemia.
Kit Napier, 75, Scottish footballer (Brighton & Hove Albion, Blackburn Rovers).
Yves Préfontaine, 82, Canadian writer.
Hedi Turki, 96, Tunisian painter.

References

2019-03
 03